Šarru-lu-dari (Akkadian:  , meaning "May the king be everlasting") was a king of Ashkelon during the reign of the Neo-Assyrian emperors Sennacherib, Esarhaddon, and Ashurbanipal. His father was named Rukibtu, who ruled Ashkelon before Šarru-lu-dari's predecessor, the rebellious king Sidqa. Though he was implicitly a Philistine, his name is uniquely Assyrian.

During Sennacherib's reign, the Levant suffered multiple rebellions against Assyrian rule. Sidqa had incited rebellion in Ashkelon, alongside the nobles of Ekron and Hezekiah of Judah. Ultimately, Sidqa was defeated after the Assyrians sacked Joppa and the surrounding cities in 701 BC. Following this, Sennacherib removed Sidqa from the throne, and replaced him with Šarru-lu-dari. Šarru-lu-dari was then forced to pay tribute to Sennacherib, as was the standard procedure in Assyria. During the reign of Sennacherib's son, Esarhaddon, Šarru-lu-dari is mentioned alongside the pharaoh Necho I in several highly fragmented correspondences. 

During the reign of Esarhaddon, Mitinti, the son of Sidqa, seemingly replaces Šarru-lu-dari as king of Ashkelon. How and why this happened is not entirely clear, though given that Šarru-lu-dari was apparently in cohorts with Necho I and is described as the governor of Pelusium during the reign of Ashurbanipal, it is possible that he was "reassigned" by Esarhaddon for whatever reason. As for why Mitinti, son of Sidqa, was his replacement, it is possible Esarhaddon placed Mitinti on the throne because he was the son of the previous king, just as his father Sennacherib had placed Šarru-lu-dari on the throne for the same reasons, but the matter of Sidqa's rebellion raises questions as to why his son would have been allowed to ascend the throne. It is also possible that Sidqa and Mitinti were close relatives of Rukibtu and Šarru-lu-dari, as there are no (surviving) indications that Sidqa had usurped the throne from Rukibtu.

During the reign of Esarhaddon's son Ashurbanipal, Šarru-lu-dari is listed among the Assyrian-appointed governors who fled their posts during the conquest of Egypt by the Nubian king Taharqa, where it is said he controlled the city of Ṣinu, which is probably Pelusium. Afterwards, he, Necho, and another local ruler called Pa-qruru apparently entered into a treaty with Taharqa to split up the conquered lands amidst themselves, which Ashurbanipal saw as treason. In response, his eunuchs traveled to Egypt and captured both Necho and Šarru-lu-dari, and brought them to Nineveh. Šarru-lu-dari was thrown into prison, while Ashurbanipal "had mercy" on Necho, clothing him in extravagant robes and giving him precious metals and jewels. Šarru-lu-dari likely died in captivity.

References

Philistine kings
Philistines
8th-century BC rulers
Ashkelon